Alexei Konstantinovich Yagudin (18 March 1980) is a Russian former competitive figure skater. He is the 2002 Olympic champion, a four-time World champion (1998, 1999, 2000, 2002), a three-time European champion (1998, 1999, 2002), a two-time Grand Prix Final champion (1998–1999, 2001–2002), the 1996 World Junior champion, and a two-time World Professional champion (1998, 2002).

Yagudin is the only skater (all disciplines included) to have achieved a Golden Slam, a victory in all major championships (Olympic Games, World Championships, European Championships, Grand Prix assignments, Grand Prix Final) in the same season (2001–2002). In 2003, Yagudin was awarded with the Order of Merit for the Fatherland IV degree of the Russian Federation. In 2017, he was inducted into the World Figure Skating Hall of Fame.

After his retirement from eligible skating, Yagudin has toured as a professional skater and appeared as a show host, an actor and a figure skating commentator for Russian television networks. In 2019, he opened the Figure Skating Center Alexei Yagudin in Minsk, Belarus where he coaches.

Early life
Alexei Yagudin was born on 18 March 1980 in Leningrad, Russian SFSR, Soviet Union. When Yagudin was four, his father moved to Germany, severing all contact with his wife and son. His parents would officially divorce when he was 12. He graduated from the Lesgaft National State University of Physical Education, Sport and Health.

Skating career overview

Early career
Yagudin was introduced to skating at age four by his mother, Zoya, who saw the activity as a way to improve his health. He learned all his double jumps before age ten, the five triple jumps before age twelve, and the triple Axel jump before he turned thirteen. His first coach was Alexander Mayorov, and then he was introduced to the famous Russian coach Alexei Mishin when Mayorov moved to Sweden in 1992. Yagudin trained in Mishin's group from 1992 to 1998. He began competing at the international level in 1994, and won the 1996 World Junior Championships. The famous rivalry with fellow Russian skater Evgeni Plushenko began when they trained in Mishin's group, and intensified after Yagudin left.

Senior career

In 1997, Yagudin competed in the World Championships for the first time and won a bronze medal.

In 1998, Yagudin led a Russian sweep of the medals at the 1998 European Championships with Evgeni Plushenko in second and Alexander Abt in third. Later that year, he competed at the 1998 Nagano Winter Olympics despite a severe case of pneumonia, and finished in 5th place. A month later, he won the 1998 World Championships. He became the first Russian single skater from the post-Soviet era to win the World title. He was the second-youngest male World Champion at the age of 18 years and 15 days, 6 days older than Donald McPherson in 1963. About two months after the event, Yagudin left Mishin and joined Tatiana Tarasova, who would coach him until his retirement in 2003.

In the 1998–99 season, Yagudin won eleven out of the thirteen competitions in which he participated, which included the defeat of Kurt Browning in the World Professional Championships, and winning the Grand Prix Final. At the 2000 European Championships, he finished ahead of both Plushenko and former Olympic champion Alexei Urmanov to win his second continental title. He successfully defended his world title against Plushenko at the 2000 World Championships in Nice, France.

Yagudin struggled at the beginning of the 1999–2000 season. He withdrew from the 1999–2000 Grand Prix Final due to a knee injury, and then lost to Plushenko at the Russian Championships and 2000 European Championships. At the 2000 World Championships, he won his third consecutive world title.

Yagudin's 2000–01 season was marred by injuries and inconsistency. He lost to Plushenko at the 2000–01 Grand Prix Final, Russian Championships, and the 2001 European Championships. He sustained a foot injury shortly before the 2001 World Championships in Vancouver, Canada. He stood in fifth place after the qualifying round and placed second in the short program, receiving a standing ovation and compliments of 'It was all about heart and guts' for his performance of The Revolutionary Etude. He went on to win the silver medal after ranking second in the free skate.

Yagudin started the 2001–02 Olympic season with a bronze medal at the 2001 Goodwill Games in September. He altered his training regimen as a result, and then enjoyed the best season in his career. He defeated Plushenko at the 2001–02 Grand Prix Final and regained his European title. At the 2002 Winter Olympics in Salt Lake City, Yagudin won the men's event, receiving first-place votes from every judge throughout the competition, became one of the youngest male figure skating Olympic champions. He received four 6.0 scores for his free skate. Yagudin's perfect marks are the most for an Olympic performance since Jayne Torvill and Christopher Dean's free dance in 1984 and set a record for a men's skater in the Olympics. After the Olympics, Yagudin won his fourth World title, receiving six perfect 6.0s for his short program and another two for his free skating at the competition. He became the first singles skater to receive six perfect marks for the short program, including the first ever perfect mark for required elements. This record cannot be equaled or broken because the International Skating Union introduced the ISU Judging System after the 2002–03 season.

Yagudin was diagnosed with a congenital hip disorder after the Olympic season. He was advised by doctors to stay off the ice for several months. Yagudin chose not to follow this advice and competed at 2002 Skate America. He won the short program, but withdrew due to his injury before the next segment. He later announced his retirement from competitive skating. His final performance as an eligible skater came during a farewell gala at Skate Canada with a performance of a new program, Memorial, and his short program from the previous season, Racing.

Yagudin was awarded with the Order of Merit for the Fatherland IV degree of the Russian Federation in 2003. He never won the Russian Championships, losing mainly to Evgeni Plushenko.

Professional career
Yagudin then turned professional in 2003, touring with Stars on Ice and Ice Symphony in Russia.

In 2004, Yagudin toured with Stars on Ice for the second year in a row. He also worked with the French figure skater Brian Joubert as a consultant coach. In November he won two professional competitions with two new programs, The Feeling Begins (music by Peter Gabriel) and Moon Over Bourbon Street (music by Sting). The next year, he continued with the Stars on Ice tour and his Passion program was choreographed with a difficult acrobatic routine that took place seven meters up in the air. Since returning to his hometown of Saint Petersburg in 2005, Yagudin has skated in various Russian ice shows and took part in the Russian TV show Stars on Ice, later renamed Ice Age.

In 2006, after a full Olympic cycle since Salt Lake City, Yagudin performed his famous Winter program on tour and a new program Sway (music by Pussycat Dolls). In 2007, Yagudin first toured in the U.S. with the Stars on Ice, and then toured in Russia. He skated a comic number Blues for Klook and a flamenco number Legenda. In July 2007, Yagudin underwent surgery to have a titanium hip joint implanted. In August, Yagudin announced that he intended to return to eligible sports after more than four years of competing as a professional skater. His former coach Tatiana Tarasova and former choreographer Nikolai Morozov agreed to coach him should he return. However, Yagudin suffered another injury while on tour in November 2007. Afterward he stated that returning to competitive skating would be too difficult under the circumstances.

In June 2010, he skated in the Supermatch: Medalist on Ice show in Korea, performing Sway and Winter. On September 4, he participated in the Artistry on Ice show in Beijing. During the show, the wedding ceremony of the famous Chinese pair skaters Shen Xue and Zhao Hongbo, the 2010 Olympic champions was held. As one of the invited guests he gave his blessing to the couple and performed Winter and Sway afterward. It was his first visit to China.

In 2011, Yagudin told an interviewer that due to the hip replacement surgery he had undergone, he is no longer able to do all his triple jumps. He continues to perform his popular Winter program in shows around the world. 

In 2017, he was inducted into the World Figure Skating Hall of Fame.

In 2019, he opened the Figure Skating Center Alexei Yagudin in Minsk, Belarus.

Acting and host career
In Russia, Yagudin has worked as a show host, actor and a figure skating commentator for Russian television networks.

In fall of 2006, he took part in the Russian TV show Stars on Ice having a former gymnast, Oksana Viktorovna Pouchkina, as his partner. He later realized that a return to eligible skating would not be feasible, and continued his professional career, taking part in the Russian TV show again, which was renamed Ice Age. This time he was paired with a pop singer Victoria Dayneko with whom he also recorded a song Needle. In 2008, Yagudin finished the Ice Age tour and then made his debut as the title role of Vladimir Putin in the satirical play The President's Vacation, written by Tatiana Chertova and Igor Kositsyn. It premiered at the Satire Theater in Moscow.

His career as an actor continued with getting one of the main roles in a Russian TV series about figure skating Hot Ice (2009). He also adventured into a popular TV show Good evening, Moscow! as a host in 2009. In 2010, he performed in the ice musical City Lights, written by Ilia Averbukh. That same year, he participated in the second season of Ice Age partnered with actress Valeria Lanskaya and would complete a third season of the show with her has his partner.

In 2013, he acted with Miroslava Karpovich at the Moscow Comedy Theater in the play Don't Trust Your Eyes. In 2018, he acted in two comedic plays with Anna Gorshkova in St. Petersburg, Russia. He has appeared numerous times as a host on I Want to Know, a Russian television series where celebrities interview people to learn about their culture. Since 2019, he hosts his own television show called Ice is melting with Alexei Yagudin where he interviews athletes. In 2021, he was a jury member for the Russian talent show, I'm Almost Famous.

Public image
Yagudin published his autobiography, Alexei Yagudin: Overcome, in Japan in 2005. It was published in Russia in 2007 under the title, НаPRолом, with extra chapters and photos added to cover his recent life. 

In 2011, Yagudin joined a Russian campaign to promote healthy lifestyles. He took part in free physical trainings held in Moscow, Saint Petersburg, Rostov-on-Don, Ekaterinburg, Samara, Kazan, and Novosibirsk. He stated, "I would like to achieve through this campaign at least the understanding of people that 30 or 40 minutes of their day can improve their health now and in the future." 

He was the Joint United Nations Program on HIV/AIDS ambassador for the 2019 European Games, saying, "Sport, in all its varieties, unites millions of people around the world and, as a UNAIDS Ambassador, I am absolutely convinced that an HIV status should not affect either the attitude towards a person or his ability to pursue his life plans."

In 2020, Yagudin made controversial remarks about black transgender people in an Instagram story post, calling them "mistakes of nature" and wishing them to die. The post came in reaction to fellow figure skater and activist Adam Rippon making a donation to the Okra Project, a charity aimed at helping underprivileged black transgender people. Yagudin soon deleted the post and apologized for his comments the next day. Rippon criticized Yagudin for the comments and made another $1000 donation, this time in Yagudin's name, to the same organization.

He spoke out against the 2022 Russian invasion of Ukraine, posting an all-black image on his Instagram account with the message, "Stop this nonsense!"

Personal life
Yagudin moved to the United States in 1999 to train with Tatiana Tarasova. He lived in the United States for almost seven years before returning to Russia. In 1999, the Champions on Ice tour dismissed him because of his alleged excessive drinking. Yagudin underwent hip surgery in 2003 after touring with Stars on Ice. He assisted Tarasova with coaching over the summer and early fall until his arrest for driving while intoxicated in August 2003. On 2 June 2008, Yagudin's car was stolen with one of his World Championships gold medals in it. The medal and car were never located.

In 2016, Yagudin married Olympic pair skating champion Tatiana Totmianina. She gave birth to their first child, a daughter named Elizaveta ("Liza"), on 20 November 2009. The couple stated they do not want Liza to become a competitive skater, and hope she will concentrate on studying and music as she grows up. On 2 October 2015, the couple's second daughter, Michèle, was born. They also have a Yorkshire Terrier named Varia. 

He identifies as an atheist. He admitted that he only wore a cross during his skating career because he found it beautiful and his children were not baptized. The Yagudin family resides in Moscow and France, where his daughters attended a French school.

Honors and awards
 Order of Merit for the Fatherland, 4th class (5 May 2003) – for outstanding contribution to the development of physical culture and sports, high achievements in sports at the XIX Olympic Games 2002 in Salt Lake City
 National Sports Award "Glory," "Best Athlete of 2002"
2017 World Figure Skating Hall of Fame inductee

Programs

Competitive highlights

Major events
GP: Champions Series / Grand Prix

All events

Amateur status, senior-level

Amateur status, junior-level

Professional status

References

External links

 
 Olympics.org Athlete Profile – Yagudin

Russian male single skaters
Figure skaters at the 1998 Winter Olympics
Figure skaters at the 2002 Winter Olympics
Olympic figure skaters of Russia
Olympic gold medalists for Russia
Figure skaters from Saint Petersburg
1980 births
Living people
Olympic medalists in figure skating
World Figure Skating Championships medalists
European Figure Skating Championships medalists
World Junior Figure Skating Championships medalists
Medalists at the 2002 Winter Olympics
Goodwill Games medalists in figure skating
Competitors at the 1994 Goodwill Games
Competitors at the 2001 Goodwill Games
Russian activists against the 2022 Russian invasion of Ukraine